The T2 Corporation Income Tax Return or T2 is the form used in Canada by corporations to file their income tax return.  All corporations other than registered charities must file a T2 return for every taxation year, regardless of whether tax is payable. The form has to be filed within six months of the end of each corporation's fiscal year. 

This article is not intended to provide tax advice.

See also
 Taxation in Canada

References
  cra-arc.gc.ca: Who has to file a T2 return?
  cra-arc.gc.ca: When do you have to file your return?

External links
 cra-arc.gc.ca: T2 Corporation Income Tax Return (2005 and later taxation years)
 cra-arc.gc.ca: T2 General Returns, Schedules and Guides

Taxation in Canada
Tax forms